The Devil Strikes at Night is a 1957 West German film directed by Robert Siodmak. It was nominated for the Academy Award for Best Foreign Language Film and is based on the true story of Bruno Lüdke.

It is a highly fictionalized account of the hunt for serial killer Bruno Lüdke, as he murders women during the last year or two of World War II. In one of the crimes a man is arrested who is obviously innocent. An investigator who starts to get a thread which leads to the real killer is frustrated by Nazi authorities who feel that revealing the truth will undermine the people's faith in their supposedly infallible system. The detective story gradually becomes a story about the evils of political propaganda and corruption.

The film's sets were designed by the art directors Gottfried Will and Rolf Zehetbauer. Location shooting took place in Berlin and Munich.

Cast
 Claus Holm as Kriminalkommissar Axel Kersten
 Annemarie Düringer as Helga Hornung
 Mario Adorf as Bruno Lüdke
 Hannes Messemer as SS-Gruppenfuehrer Rossdorf
 Carl Lange as Major Thomas Wollenberg
 Werner Peters as Willi Keun
 Walter Janssen as Kriminalrat Boehm
 Peter Carsten as SS- Standartenfuhrer Mollwitz
 Wilmut Borell as SS-Sturmbannfuhrer Heinrich, Rossdorf's aide
 Monika John as Lucy Hansen, Kellnerin
 Rose Schäfer as Anna Hohmann
 Lukas Ammann as Pflichtverteidiger von Keun
 Karl-Heinz Peters as Hauswart

See also
 List of submissions to the 30th Academy Awards for Best Foreign Language Film
 List of German submissions for the Academy Award for Best Foreign Language Film

References

External links
 
 

1957 films
West German films
1950s German-language films
Films set in Berlin
1957 crime drama films
1950s thriller films
German thriller films
German detective films
Political drama films
Films directed by Robert Siodmak
Film noir
German black-and-white films
German serial killer films
Films about Nazi Germany
Films based on non-fiction books
Gloria Film films
1950s serial killer films
1950s German films